The 1952 Akron Zips football team was an American football team that represented the University of Akron in the Ohio Athletic Conference (OAC) during the 1952 college football season. In their second and final season under head coach Kenneth Cochrane, the Zips compiled a 2–6–1 record (2–2–1 against OAC opponents) and were outscored by a total of 156 to 121. Joe Mazzaferro and Bob Vogt were the team captains. The team played its home games at the Rubber Bowl in Akron, Ohio.

Schedule

References

Akron
Akron Zips football seasons
Akron Zips football